Uruca is a district of the Santa Ana canton, in the San José province of Costa Rica. It is popularly called "Río de Oro".

Geography 
Uruca has an area of  km² and an elevation of  metres.

Locations
Its neighborhoods are:
 Chimba
 Guapinol
 Mata Grande
 Mina
 Paso Machete (part)
 Río Uruca

Demographics 

For the 2011 census, Uruca had a population of  inhabitants.

Transportation

Road transportation 
The district is covered by the following road routes:
 National Route 27
 National Route 121

References 

Districts of San José Province
Populated places in San José Province